Desire is a Canadian electronic music band from Montreal, formed in 2009. The band consists of vocalist Megan Louise and producer Johnny Jewel (a former member of Chromatics and Glass Candy). Formerly, Nat Walker (also a former member of Chromatics) is also on the band on synthesizer and drums. Their debut studio album, II, was released on June 30, 2009 on the Italians Do It Better label. Their lyrics are in French and English.

Fact magazine listed II as the 14th best album of 2009. In 2009, the band's song "Under Your Spell" was featured in the 2010 S/S Max Mara fashion show, as well as in the Christian Dior Haute Couture Spring-Summer 2012. The track also appeared in the soundtrack to the 2011 films Drive and Oslo, August 31st. Kid Cudi sampled "Under Your Spell" for the 2012 song "Teleport 2 Me, Jamie", released as the first single from the self-titled debut album of his WZRD rock project. Desire recorded the song "Behind the Mask" for the soundtrack to the 2015 film Lost River.

The band would support Chromatics for the "Double Exposure" tour, with Jewel and Heaven vocalist Aja performing on synthesizers for Desire.

Discography
Studio albums
 Desire (2009)
Montre Moi Ton Visage - 2:34
Mirroir Mirroir - 5:18
Don't Call - 4:34
Dans Mes Reves - 5:23
Under Your Spell - 4:56
Colorless Sky - 3:56
If I Can't Hold You - 7:18
Part II - 7:09
 Escape (2022)
Black Latex - 4:41
Telling Me Lies - 4:07
Liquid Dreams - 3:16
Love Is A Crime (ft. Mirage) - 3:27
Zeros - 4:19
Dark Age - 2:14
Haenim (ft. Ether) - 4:19
Ghosts - 3:37
Escape - 3:34
The Young & The Restless - 3:05
Days & Nights - 3:23
L’Amulette De La Vie - 1:09
Friends & Enemies - 4:14
Singles
 "If I Can't Hold You" (2009)
 "Under Your Spell" (2009)
 "Tears from Heaven" (2018)
 "Bizarre Love Triangle" (2020)
 "Escape" (2020)
 "Black Latex" (2020)
 "Liquid Dreams" (2020)
 "Boy (Book of Love song)" (cover) (2020)
 "Zeros" (2021)
 "Future Lights" with Double Mixte (2021)
 "Ghosts" (2021)
 "Haenim" ft. Ether (2021)
 "Can't Get You Out of My Head" ft. Guy Gerber (2022)
 "54321" ft. Omar-S (2022)

References

External links
 
 Article about Johnny Jewel from The Guardian
 Interview with Jewel from The Portland Mercury

2009 establishments in Canada
Canadian new wave musical groups
Canadian synthpop groups
Italo disco groups
Musical groups established in 2009
Musical groups from Montreal
Canadian musical trios